Missouri Route 5 is the longest state highway in Missouri and the only Missouri state highway to traverse the entire state. It is part of a three state, 650 mile highway 5.  To the north, it continues into Iowa as Iowa Highway 5 and to the south it enters Arkansas as Highway 5. With only a few exceptions, it is two-lane for its entire length. Business Route 5 serves Milan and Ava.

Route description
Route 5 begins at the Arkansas state line in Ozark County as a continuation of Arkansas Highway 5.

Thirteen miles into Douglas County, Route 5 forms a four-mile north–south concurrency with Route 76 past Ava, and serves the town itself with a business route. Within the northwest part of Ava, the concurrent routes intersect Route 14. After Route 76 leaves the concurrency to the east, Route 5 continues for 10 miles before entering Wright County.

Shortly after entering Wright County, Route 5 forms a one-mile east–west concurrency with U.S. 60 (as a limited-access highway) in Mansfield. After leaving its U.S. 60 concurrency to the north, the route intersects with Route 38 in Hartville 11 miles later, and then continues for 24 miles into Laclede County.

In Laclede County, Route 5 passes through Evergreen, intersects I-44, Route 32 and Route 64 in Lebanon, and enters Camden County 16 miles north of Lebanon.

Between Lebanon and Camdenton, the road has been realigned and straightened, and several older alignments are visible. Just south of Camdenton, Route 5 forms an 11-mile north–south concurrency with Route 7 which continues through the town and intersects U.S. Route 54. After Route 7 leaves the concurrency to the west, Route 5 leaves the Ozark Mountains and crosses the Lake of the Ozarks at the Hurricane Deck Bridge, passing through Sunrise Beach shortly before entering Morgan County.

Twenty miles north into Morgan County, Route 5 forms a short east–west concurrency with Route 52 in Versailles. After leaving its Route 52 concurrency to the north, it continues north for 14 miles and enters Tipton, in which the route forms a four-mile east–west concurrency with U.S. 50. Soon after leaving its U.S. 50 concurrency to the north, Route 5 enters Cooper County.

In Cooper County, Route 5 continues north for 20 miles before intersecting I-70 just south of Boonville.  Three miles north of I-70, the route enters Boonville and forms a triple concurrency with U.S. 40 and Route 87. All three routes together cross the Missouri River into Howard County.

Immediately after entering Howard County, Route 87 leaves the concurrency to the west, and less than a mile thereafter, U.S. 40 leaves the concurrency to the east. From there, Route 5 continues north to Fayette, in which it forms a nine-mile concurrency with Route 240 that starts with a north–south alignment, but becomes an east–west alignment after intersecting Route 3. Shortly thereafter, Route 240 leaves the concurrency to the south (ultimately heading west), and Route 5 enters Glasgow, after which it returns to a north–south alignment and enters Chariton County.

Thirteen miles to the north of the Chariton County line, Route 5 forms a five-mile east–west concurrency with U.S. 24 and enters Keytesville, where it leaves the concurrency to the north and enters Linn County 21 miles later.

After entering Linn County, Route 5 immediately passes through Marceline and forms a 12-mile east–west concurrency with U.S. 36 (proposed future Interstate 72) past Brookfield, where they intersect Route 11 together. In Laclede, the route leaves the concurrency to the north at its intersection with Route 139, and passes through Linneus before entering Sullivan County.

In Sullivan County, Route 5 forms an eight-mile concurrency with Route 6 as they bypass Milan to the south and east. Business Route 5 serves Milan directly, using an older alignment of the route, and ends north of the town where Route 6 leaves the concurrent bypass to the east. From there, Route 5 enters Putnam County 15 miles later.

In Putnam County, Route 5 forms a brief east–west concurrency with U.S. Route 136 in Unionville. After leaving its U.S. 136 concurrency to the north, the route crosses the Iowa state line and turns into Iowa Highway 5 in Appanoose County.

Route 5 from I-44 in Lebanon to U.S. 50 in Tipton is a part of the National Highway System, a system of highways important to the nation's defense, economy, and mobility.

History
As built in the original 1922 road system, the route is largely unchanged from its first path. Most of the paths bypassed are now business routes through cities.

In the 1950s a section of the route in Wright, Douglas and Ozark counties between Mansfield and Gainesville was straightened and widened. At this time the city of Ava was bypassed and the old route through the center of the town became business Route 5.

In 2009, a section of the route in Camdenton was rerouted onto a new four-lane highway. The old section became business Route 5.

Improvements between Lebanon and Camdenton
Beginning in the summer of 2008, MoDOT began a project to convert Route 5 into a "shared four-lane" highway, with continuous passing lanes based on the European 2+1 road model, between Lebanon and Camdenton. A shared four-lane road can be constructed largely within the same footprint as a two-lane road, but allows for alternating passing lanes in each direction.  A number of roadways in Europe are built in this way, but Missouri is among the first to do so in the U.S., having first used the method on separate segments of US 63 and Route 37.  The project was completed in 2010.

Major intersections

Business routes

Ava route

A two-mile business route of MO 5 exists in Ava.

Camdenton route

A five-mile business route of MO 5 exists in Camdenton.

Milan route

A three-mile business route of MO 5 exists in Milan.

See also

References

External links

005
Transportation in Ozark County, Missouri
Transportation in Douglas County, Missouri
Transportation in Wright County, Missouri
Transportation in Laclede County, Missouri
Transportation in Camden County, Missouri
Transportation in Morgan County, Missouri
Transportation in Moniteau County, Missouri
Transportation in Cooper County, Missouri
Transportation in Howard County, Missouri
Transportation in Chariton County, Missouri
Transportation in Linn County, Missouri
Transportation in Sullivan County, Missouri
Transportation in Putnam County, Missouri